Echium judaeum, commonly known as the Judean viper's bugloss, is an annual plant endemic to southern Lebanon, southern Syria and Israel, of the Boraginaceae family, and which, like other herbaceous flowering plants of the same genus, derives its name from the style's resemblance to the forked-tongue of a serpent during the flower's pistillate-stage of development.

Description
The Echium judaeum grows to a height of about 50 cm, with funnel-shaped flowers that bloom between February and May. It is one of the few flowering plants where a lavender-coloured flower and a pink-coloured flower can be seen growing alongside each other from the same inflorescence. When revisiting the plant after a few days, the lavender-colour turns a deep purple, violet, or blue. This discoloration of the flower is said to happen after pollination. The flower is bisexual, with petals measuring 25-32 mm in length.

The simple leaves and stems of the plant are completely covered with fine bristles that protrude from dark scales, and which makes touching unpleasant.
In Arabic, the species of plant is known by the name Hyena's henna. In Modern Hebrew, the plant is called "the serpent of Judah".

Habitat
The plant grows in shrub lands, but also appears in deserts. In Ottoman Palestine, the flower's pollen was harvested by honey bees in the production of honey.

Further reading

Gallery

References

External links 
Flora of Israel Online, by Prof. Avinoam Danin

judaeum
Flora of Lebanon
Flora of Israel
Flora of Palestine (region)